Pierre-Henri Teitgen (29 May 1908 – 6 April 1997) was a French lawyer, professor and politician. Teitgen was born in Rennes, Brittany. Taken POW in 1940, he played a major role in the French Resistance. Teitgen's father, Henri Teitgen (1882–1965), was a senior politician of the centre-right MRP (party).

A member of French Parliament from 1945 to 1958 for Ille-et-Vilaine, Pierre-Henri was president of the Popular Republican Movement (Christian Democratic Party) from 1952 to 1956. He was Minister of Information in 1944 (one of the founders of the daily Le Monde), Minister of Justice in 1945–1946 (in charge of the purges from government of the Vichy regime's followers and of Nazi collaborators), Minister of Defence in 1947–48 in Robert Schuman's government at the time of the insurrectional strikes. In May 1948, he attended the Congress of The Hague and worked closely with Robert Schuman in Schuman Declaration and the start of the European Community when he was Minister of Information and Civil service in 1949–1950. He was later Minister of Overseas in 1950. He was member of the Constitutional Committee in 1958. He was twice deputy prime minister in 1947–1948 and 1953–1954. He was member of the Consultative Constitutional Committee in 1958 but became a critic of de Gaulle's policies.

He supported the Socialist Defferre in his attempt as candidate for presidency in 1965. In September 1976, he was appointed member of the European Court of Human Rights. He had helped to create the court some 27 years earlier, in 1949, outlining its powers and the rights it should protect in a report for the Consultative Assembly of the Council of Europe. Teitgen died in Paris in 1997.

References

Further reading
 Teitgen, Pierre-Henri; Faites entrer le Temoin suivant 1988 

1908 births
1997 deaths
Politicians from Rennes
French people of German descent
Popular Republican Movement politicians
French Ministers of Justice
French Ministers of Overseas France
Ministers of Information of France
Members of the Constituent Assembly of France (1945)
Members of the Constituent Assembly of France (1946)
Deputies of the 1st National Assembly of the French Fourth Republic
Deputies of the 2nd National Assembly of the French Fourth Republic
Deputies of the 3rd National Assembly of the French Fourth Republic
Judges of the European Court of Human Rights
French military personnel of World War II
French Resistance members
French people of the Algerian War
Grand Officiers of the Légion d'honneur
Grand Cross of the Ordre national du Mérite
French judges of international courts and tribunals